The Hutchinson Memorial Library is located in Randolph, Wisconsin.

History
The library was built in 1936. Previously, Randolph had featured a circulating library.

References

Libraries on the National Register of Historic Places in Wisconsin
National Register of Historic Places in Dodge County, Wisconsin
Public libraries in Wisconsin
Moderne architecture in the United States
Library buildings completed in 1936